Kamalvand-e Golamali (also Romanized as Kamālvand-e Gholām ʿAlī and Kamālvand-e Golām‘alī; also known as Kamālvand) is a village in Dehpir Rural District, in the Central District of Khorramabad County, Lorestan Province, Iran. At the 2006 census, its population was 717, in 172 families.

References 

Towns and villages in Khorramabad County